Gabonjin is a village in the middle of the island Krk in Croatia. It has a population of 201 (2011).
It is part of the municipality of Dobrinj.

References

External links
 Municipality of Dobrinj 
 Gabonjin.com - web page about Gabonjin village

Populated places in Primorje-Gorski Kotar County
Resorts in Croatia
Krk